The 2016–17 Liga Nacional de Básquet season was the 33rd season of the top professional basketball league in Argentina. The regular season started on 22 September 2016. San Lorenzo won their second title in a row, defeating Regatas Corrientes in the finals.

Relegation and promotion
Torneo Nacional de Ascenso Champions Hispano Americano covered the berth left by Juventud Sionista, who lost the relegation playoffs against Lanús. Lanús, however, withdrew from the League due to financial difficulties and sold its spot. The berth was purchased by Atlético Echagüe, who would be relegated at the end of the season after losing the relegation series against Boca Juniors.

Clubs

Regular season

League table

North Conference

South Conference

Playoffs
Playoffs are set to begin on 22 May. The relegation series between Boca Juniors and Atlético Echagüe is set to begin on 24 May.

Championship playoffs

Relegation playoffs

Clubs in international competitions

Awards
The regular season awards were presented on 18 May.

Yearly Awards
Most Valuable Player: Dar Tucker, Estudiantes Concordia
Best Argentine Player: Gabriel Deck, San Lorenzo
Best Foreign Player:  Dar Tucker, Estudiantes Concordia
Sixth Man of the Year: José Vildoza, Libertad
Rookie of the Year: Mateo Chiarini, Atenas
Most Improved Player: Eric Flor, Quilmes
Coach of the Year: Hernán Laginestra, Estudiantes Concordia
All-Tournament Team:
 F Marcos Mata, San Lorenzo
 F Gabriel Deck, San Lorenzo
 C Javier Justiz, Estudiantes Concordia
 G Franco Balbi, Ferro Carril Oeste
 G Dar Tucker, Estudiantes Concordia

Player of the Week

Player of the Month

References

Liga Nacional de Básquet seasons
 
Argentina